"Better Off Alone" is a 1998 single by Alice Deejay.

Better Off Alone may also refer to:

 Better Off Alone, a 1999 EP by Bullet for My Valentine, or its title track
 "Better Off Alone" (Grinspoon song)
 Better Off Alone, a 2011 EP by Friends, now known as Better Off
 "Better Off Alone", 1996 song by Wang Lee Hom from album "If You Heard My Song"
 "Better Off Alone", 1977 single by Jan Howard
 "Better Off Alone", 1986 single by The Good Brothers from album Delivering the Goods''''
 "Better Off Alone", 2007 single by The Black Angels from Passover "Better Off Alone", 2007 song by Katharine McPhee from Katharine McPhee''